Salisbury Center Bridge is the only covered bridge in Herkimer County, New York State. The bridge has vertical board siding and is topped by a gable roof. The wooden bridge is one of 29 covered bridges in New York State.

It was added to the National Register of Historic Places in 1972.

References

External links

 Salisbury Center Bridge, at New York State Covered Bridge Society
 Salisbury Center Bridge, at Covered Bridges of the Northeast USA

Covered bridges on the National Register of Historic Places in New York (state)
Bridges completed in 1875
Wooden bridges in New York (state)
Bridges in Herkimer County, New York
Tourist attractions in Herkimer County, New York
National Register of Historic Places in Herkimer County, New York
Road bridges on the National Register of Historic Places in New York (state)
Burr Truss bridges in the United States
1875 establishments in New York (state)